Brian Christopher Schweda (born April 30, 1943) is a former American football player who played for the Chicago Bears and New Orleans Saints of the National Football League (NFL). He played college football at the University of Kansas.

References

1943 births
Living people
American football defensive ends
Kansas Jayhawks football players
Chicago Bears players
New Orleans Saints players
Players of American football from Kansas
Sportspeople from Kansas City, Kansas